The Douglas Mental Health University Institute (formerly the Douglas Hospital and originally the Protestant Hospital for the Insane) is a Canadian psychiatric hospital located in the borough of Verdun in the city of Montreal, Quebec. It is also a teaching hospital affiliated with McGill University.

History
Founded on July 19, 1881, by Alfred Perry and a group of Protestant clergy and Montreal citizens, the Douglas Institute was originally named the "Protestant Hospital for the Insane." At the time, Montreal had another psychiatric hospital, but it was a francophone Catholic hospital, and the Douglas was meant to offer psychiatric services to the anglophone Protestant minority. The founders put an advertisement in the local newspaper to seek funds for a new building to be constructed, and local philanthropists offered generous donations.

In 2006, the Douglas was designated a University Institute in Mental Health. It is named in honour of James Douglas (1800–1886) and his family. Douglas (whose family name is sometimes spelled Douglass) was a Scottish-born physician who practiced in Quebec City and was involved in the foundation of the Asile de Beauport.

Mission

The Douglas provides specialized mental health care services for the very young to the elderly. It contributes to destigmatizing mental illness through its public education program, among them the Mini-Psych School and Frames of Mind film festival. In keeping with prevention and recovery principles, the Douglas contributes to the advancement of knowledge and best practices through state-of-the-art research and teaching. It also respects the basic human rights of patients as stated in the Quebec Charter of Human Rights, whilst keeping them in involuntary committal if they prove to be a danger to themselves or to others, in accordance with the Quebec Justice system.

Infrastructure and patient care
The Reed Pavilion takes in patients who call to receive treatment through the Emergency. It consists of an Intensive Care Unit on the right side and Psychiatric Emergency on the left. Patients are held there for evaluation by a psychiatrist. Usually after diagnosis, if the patient accepts the treatment, he will stay until well enough to return to society. If the patient refuses treatment and the evaluating psychiatrist deems him a risk to himself or society, the patient and psychiatrist are heard by a judge who will confirm or deny a temporary involuntary commitment order. If returned to the hospital, the patient is usually transferred to another unit. One of these units is called the "Centre Psychiatrique Communautaire" (The Psychiatric Community Centre) or CPC2. The CPC2 is a place where patients usually stay for a maximum 20 days until they can re-enter the community. Sometimes through court order, the patient may stay longer. The patients receive free room and board, there are 2 TVs for entertainment, a radio, some gym equipment, and some board games. The patients are given their medication at appropriate times and must usually stay until the psychiatrist gives clearance to leave.

Foundation
The Douglas Mental Health University Institute Foundation is a nonprofit organization that seeks donations for the Douglas Mental Health University Institute. The Douglas Institute is the second largest mental health research centre in Canada. With the support of the Foundation, it is better able to carry out its mission: care for patients with mental illness, research into neuroscience to uncover the causes of mental illness and improve treatments, and knowledge transfer between practitioners in the mental health field. The Foundation's most recent contribution was towards a $20 million brain imaging centre that was scheduled to open in 2011. It also funds the World Health Organization (WHO) Collaborating Centre. As much as the Institute relies upon the Foundation's support, the Foundation remains an independent public organization.

The Douglas Institute Foundation was created in 1972. Its mandate was to collect and manage donations through the help of volunteers. Today, the Foundation is led and supported by a Board of Directors made up of 24 members who are elected at the Foundation's annual public assembly.

As Dr. Gustavo Turecki says "The big difference at the Douglas Institute is that clinicians are also researchers." The institute uses a collaborative and comprehensive approach that includes prevention, treatment, and public intervention. The Institute houses ongoing studies about the genetic component of mental illness and the environmental triggers, that, when combined with a certain genetic predisposition, can make certain individuals more vulnerable. When an illness manifests itself, sufferers and family members are able to seek specialized treatment and support at the institute, whether through an initial diagnosis at its own emergency room or by referral from a healthcare professional. To further develop understanding of mental disorders, the Institute studies public access to and usage of available resources so that these can be improved and mental illness better treated and prevented.

Maison Claude-Laramée
Douglas Institute helped in creating Maison Claude-Laramée (MCL) in Verdun, in the Montreal area. MCL is a rehabilitation residence for people who have severe long-lasting psychotic illness and also drug or alcohol abuse or dependence.

Serving nine people at a time, in single rooms, MCL is jointly run by Douglas Institute and the Old Brewery Mission. The day-to-day operations are managed by staff members of the Old Brewery Mission, which is a Montreal organization serving homeless and poor people. Costs for each bed are about $25,000 per year. This compares to about $300,000 per year for a patient to occupy a bed in a hospital. Almost all residents are on welfare, and pay about $8,000 per year to stay there, out of their monthly welfare cheques. The rest of the costs are subsidized.

See also
 Allan Memorial Institute
 Institut Philippe-Pinel de Montréal
 Institut universitaire en santé mentale de Montréal
 Montreal Neurological Institute and Hospital
 Old Brewery Mission

Notable people

References

External links
 Official website
 Douglas Foundation
 Douglas Research Centre
 Douglas Hospital interactive map
 Justice and Mental Health in Quebec
 Quebec Charter of Human Rights 

Psychiatric hospitals in Canada
Teaching hospitals in Canada
Hospitals in Montreal
Hospitals established in 1881
Verdun, Quebec
1881 establishments in Quebec
World Health Organization collaborating centres
McGill University buildings